Agata is a female yellow Labrador Retriever drug detection dog who works at Leticia, Colombia. In 2004, Colombian drug barons placed a $10,000 bounty on her head, resulting in the dog and her handler being assigned a bodyguard and her food being monitored for poison. The bounty was the result of her superior skills at drug detection, having stopped more than three hundred kilos  of cocaine, worth more than seven million dollars, and twenty kilos of heroin. She was decorated for her work.

See also
 List of individual dogs

References 

Individual dogs